Plasmodium gonatodi is a parasite of the genus Plasmodium.

Like all Plasmodium species P. gonatodi has both vertebrate and insect hosts. The vertebrate hosts for this parasite are reptiles.

Description 

This species was first described by Telford in 2007.

Both proerythrocytes and erythrocytes are commonly infected. The infected cells are hypertrophied and distorted and their nuclei are displaced.

The schizonts are polymorphic and contain 12-46 nuclei when apparently mature.

Prematuration sexual stages may be irregularly shaped and larger than mature gametocytes.

The gametocytes are elongate.

Geographical occurrence 

This species is found in Panama.

Vectors

Not known.

Clinical features and host pathology 

This species infects the lizard Gonatodes albogularis fuscus.

References 

gonatodi